Torticaulis may refer to:

 Dioscorea torticaulis, a species of the flowering plant genus Dioscorea
 Senecio torticaulis, a species of the genus Senecio, in the sunflower family

See also
 Tortilicaulis, a moss-like plant known from fossils